1995 Rugby League World Cup Group A was one of the three groups in the 1995 Rugby League World Cup. The group consisted of three countries: Australia, England, Fiji and South Africa.

Ladder

England vs Australia

Fiji vs South Africa

Australia vs South Africa
The Kangaroos scored a World Cup and international league record 16 tries against minnows South Africa. Australian halfback Andrew Johns kicked 11 goals (from 16 attempts) to break the record for most goals kicked in a rugby league test. Gideon Watts scored the Rhinos only try of the tournament. With the selection of Cronulla hooker Aaron Raper, he became Australia's first second generation World Cup player following the footsteps of his famous father Johnny Raper who captained Australia to World Cup success in 1968. Australian coach Bob Fulton had been a team mate of Raper's father in the 1968 Rugby League World Cup Final win over France.

England vs Fiji
England captain Shaun Edwards was on the bench and remained there for the entire game amid rumours of a knee injury. The rumours turned out to be true and Edwards did not play again in the tournament. The captaincy was then handed to former Wigan team mate Denis Betts making history by becoming the first player chosen to captain England while not playing in the English premiership. Betts at the time was playing for the Auckland Warriors in the Australian Rugby League competition.

Australia vs Fiji

England vs South Africa
England went into the match already having booked a Semi-final berth. For South Africa, the Rhinos had pride on the line and the want to not have England put a big score on them. The Rhinos earned the respect of their opponents and the 14,041 crowd at Headingley with a willing display.

References

External links
1995 World Cup audio highlights
1995 World Cup Final at rlphotos.com
1995 World Cup data at hunterlink.net.au
1995 World Cup at rlif.com
1995 World Cup at rlhalloffame.org.uk
1995 World Cup at rugbyleagueproject.com
1995 World Cup at 188-rugby-league.co.uk